Southwick's Zoo is a , privately owned and operated, zoological park located in Mendon, Massachusetts, United States. It was opened in 1963 and has been run by members of the Southwick and Brewer families ever since.

History

The Southwick homestead (which the zoo now occupies) dates back to 1803 when it was a working dairy farm. In the 1930s, Justin F. Southwick started collecting exotic poultry. His son, Justin A. Southwick, shared his father's love of birds, and became a leading authority on migratory waterfowl. In 1953, he sold the dairy herd to concentrate on birds. In 1956, he placed a donation box at the barn where he kept his birds. These donations allowed him to purchase more birds for his collection.

The Southwick family opened the zoo in 1963 under the name Southwick Wild Animal Farm. In 1965, they formed two companies: Southwick's Wild Animal Farm Inc. and Southwick's Birds and Animals Inc., with Justin A. Southwick as president of both, his son Dan as vice-president of Birds and Animals Inc. (which traded, sold, and leased animals), and his son-in-law Robert Brewer as vice-president of Wild Animal Farm Inc. In 1970, the Brewer family left the business and moved to Vermont. After the death of his father, Dan Southwick took over the businesses in 1971. Dan passed away in 1977 and with his death, the zoo suffered for a while until the Brewer family moved back and took over operations in 1981. Robert Brewer was president of the zoo for 14 years until his death in 1995. His wife, Justine Brewer, then took over and served as president for 20 years. She retired in 2016 and her son, Dr. Peter Brewer, became president.

The zoo currently comprises more than 250 acres and houses more than 750 animals. It features six mechanical rides, a park, and a petting zoo that includes African pygmy goats and sheep. Southwick's Zoo also offers giraffe and rhinoceros encounters. Proceeds from rhinoceros encounters are donated to the International Rhino Foundation to support rhinoceros conservation.  In the past few years, new shows have been introduced for family entertainment and education, including Bird Shows and Training and Earth Educational presentations.

The zoo is open to the public mid-April through October.

Exhibits

North American Exhibit 
This exhibit is home to North American elk and a small population of wild turkey. The Woodland Express Train (12 min ride), a rubber tire train ride, passes through this exhibit and allows visitors to view the elk and surrounding wetlands.

Deer Forest 
This  walk-through attraction allows visitors get close to and feed fallow deer. Native wildlife such as turtles, hawks, and wild turkey can also be spotted in the Deer Forest.

Parakeet Landing 
This walk-through aviary that lets visitors come in contact with and feed parakeets and cockatiels.

EARTH Discovery Center 
This is the home base of the environmental education nonprofit EARTH Ltd. The EARTH Discovery Center is home to EARTH's animal ambassadors, which include macaws, a bush baby, porcupine, turtles, snakes, bearded dragons, and other reptiles. These animals are used in EARTH's education programs including live presentations at the zoo, ZooMobiles, and Wild Adventure Programs for younger students. Through EARTH Ltd, the zoo offers rhino encounters in an attempt to teach visitors about and increase support for rhino conservation.

Other Animals Exhibits 
Southwick's Zoo has more than 115 species. These include capybaras, two-toed sloths, Brazilian tapirs, white rhinos, an American alligator, and more.

Big cats 
Southwick's Zoo has four big cat exhibits; lions, Bengal tigers, African leopards, and the recently added cheetahs.

Birds 
The zoo has numerous bird species besides those at Parakeet Landing. These include macaws, cockatoos, conures, eclectus, cockatiels, ostriches, African crowned cranes, flamingos, mandarin ducks, Polish chickens, fancy pigeons, and kookaburra. There are also educational programs on birds.

Primates 
The zoo has the largest primate collection in New England. Species of primates found at Southwick's Zoo include chimpanzees, white-handed gibbons, siamangs, mandrills, Schmidt's guenons, Wolf's guenons, DeBrazza's monkeys, squirrel monkeys, cotton-top tamarins, ring-tailed lemurs, red ruffed lemurs, and more. They are the only zoo in New England with a chimpanzee exhibit.

Other attractions

Other attractions at the zoo include:

 a petting zoo, pony rides, camel rides, and a play area for children; 
 the 15-minute-long Skyfari Sky Ride, which takes visitors over a large portion of the zoo in a triangular pattern and allows them to see the alligator, watusi cattle, camels, chimpanzees, mandrills, and fallow deer, from a two-seat chair lift;
 the 12-minute-long Woodland Express Train ride through the North American Exhibit, which features a rubber-tired train and gives visitors a closer look at the elk as well as native wetlands with local species like herons, snakes, turtles, and waterfowl. 
 an interactive attraction called The Elkhorn Mining Company, established in 2012, featuring a walk-in mine that allows visitors to pan for gold, gems, and fossils. The Elkhorn Livery Stables and pony rides are located next to the mine;

New exhibits and additions

Over the last 20 years, several of the animal exhibits including the chimpanzees, lions, tigers, and giraffes, have been updated to more closely resemble the animals' natural habitat.

The 15-minute-long Skyfari Skyride was added in 2008.

Southwick's Zoo began offering giraffe encounters on weekends in 2010.

The zoo opened a larger, updated giraffe exhibit in 2011.

A new, much larger prairie dog exhibit opened in 2013. It can be seen from the Woodland Express Train Station. Scimitar-horned oryxes were added to the Savannah Exhibit. There is a two-toed sloth exhibit by the chimpanzee exhibit. 

A new cheetah exhibit opened in June 2013.

In 2014, EARTH Ltd. and Southwick's Zoo began offering Rhinoceros Encounters to help promote rhino conservation. These encounters help educate the participants on the current rhino poaching crisis, and they give participants the opportunity to get close to and touch the zoo's two white rhinos named Thelma and Louise.

Other new additions for 2014 included cotton-top tamarins and Wolf's guenons.

Vicunas were added in 2015.

In 2016, Southwick's Zoo opened a new reptile and insect walk-through building that houses more than 20 species.

Red River Hogs and all new Bird Shows debuted in 2016. 

In July of each year, the zoo celebrates Zoobabies Day to highlight the many births at the zoo throughout the year.

In 2017, a new restaurant and event building opened to the public and zoo guests.

In 2021, the Festival of Illumination: World of Lights! was organized at Southwick's Zoo by Zigong Lantern Group.

Animals

Parakeet Landing 
Parakeet

Cockatiel

EARTH Discovery Center 
Grey parrot

African Pygmy Hedgehog

American Alligator

Axolotl

Ball Python

Bearded Dragon

Blue and Gold Macaw

Blue-tongued Skink

Brazilian Three-banded Armadillo

Chaco Golden Knee Tarantula

Chinchilla

Common Marmoset

Corn Snake

Crested Gecko

Domestic Ferret

Dumeril's Boa

Forest Scorpion

Kaiser's Spotted Newt

Leopard Gecko

Madagascar Hissing Cockroach

Mexican Black Kingsnake

Panther Chameleon

Rainbow Boa

Red-footed Tortoise

Red Kangaroo

Rose-haired Tarantula

Sand Boa

Sinaloan Milksnake

Small-eared Galago

Snake-necked Turtle

Snow Corn Snake

Sonoran Millipede

Sugar Glider

Tailless Whip Scorpion

Western Hognose Snake

Yellow-naped Amazon

Reptiles & Insects 
African Fat-tailed Gecko

Argentine Black and White Tegu

Asian Water Monitor

Boa Constrictor

Burmese Python

Cane Toad

Chinese Water Dragon

Five-keeled Spiny-tailed Iguana

Golden Dart Frog

Madagascar Hissing Cockroach

Salmon Pink Birdeater

White's Tree Frog

Woma

Vinegaroon

Miscellaneous Exhibits 
African Crested Porcupine

African Crowned Crane

African Leopard

African Lion

Aldabra Tortoise

American Alligator

American Elk

Aoudad

Bactrian Camel

Bengal Tiger

Bennett's Wallaby

Black-and-White Ruffed Lemur

Black-capped Capuchin

Black Crested Mangabey

Black Swan

Blue and Gold Macaw

Blue-throated Macaw

Brazilian Tapir

Capybara

Cheetah

Chilean Flamingo

Chimpanzee

Colobus Monkey

Common Marmoset

Cotton-top Tamarin

De Brazza's Monkey

Emu

Eurasian Eagle-Owl

Fallow Deer

Golden Pheasant

Grant's Zebra

Great Green Macaw

Green Iguana

Green-winged Macaw

Grivet

Hyacinth Macaw

Jacob Sheep

Lady Amherst's Pheasant

Laughing Kookaburra

Leopard Tortoise

Llama

Mandarin Duck

Mandrill

Military Macaw

Moluccan Cockatoo

North American Porcupine

Ostrich

Painted Turtle

Patagonian Cavy

Patas Monkey

Peafowl

Prairie Dog

Pygmy Goat

Red-eared Slider

Red Kangaroo

Red River Hog

Reeve's Muntjac

Reticulated Giraffe

Ring-tailed Lemur

Scarlet Macaw

Schmidt's Guenon

Scimitar-horned Oryx

Siamang

Sika Deer

South American Coati

Spotted Hyena

Squirrel Monkey

Sulcata Tortoise

Temminck's Tragopan

Two-toed Sloth

Vicuna

Vietnamese Pot-bellied Pig

Water Buffalo

Western Crowned Pigeon

White-faced Capuchin

White-handed Gibbon

White Rhinoceros

Wild Turkey

Wolf's Guenon

Wood Turtle

Yak

Red Ruffed Lemur

Warthog

Education

EARTH Ltd provides Southwick's Zoo with assorted education programs. EARTH performs live animal presentations at the EARTH Discovery Center, which cover topics including ecology and animal adaptations. EARTH also offers ZooMobiles. This outreach program involves an educator and about 8 animals traveling to a school, library, or other facility to perform an educational presentation. EARTH also operates the Wild Adventure spring and summer programs for children grades k-8. The interns and docents working at the zoo are trained by this non-profit as well.

Notes

External links 

Zoos in Massachusetts
Buildings and structures in Worcester County, Massachusetts
Tourist attractions in Worcester County, Massachusetts
Mendon, Massachusetts